Myxodagnus walkeri is a species of sand stargazer native to the Pacific coast of Central America from Nayarit, Mexico to Golfo de Nicoya, Costa Rica where it can be found at depths of from .  It can reach a maximum length of  SL. The specific name of this fish honours the fisheries biologist Boyd W. Walker (1917-2001) of the University of California, Los Angeles.

References

walkeri
Fish described in 1976
Taxa named by Charles Eric Dawson